La Constancia Mexicana is a textile factory  from downtown Puebla, in the state of Mexico. The factory was the first textile mill to integrate automatic machinery into the production process.

Site description
The factory was built within Santo Domingo Hacienda, which had an established hydrological infrastructure useful to textile manufacturing. The hacienda's architecture was updated to the 19th-century style, giving it a unique appearance. Thus, the factory introduced a new architectural style along with the new machinery.

World Heritage Status
This site was added to the UNESCO World Heritage Tentative List on December 6, 2004 in the Cultural category.

References

Colonial Mexico
Museums in Puebla
World Heritage Sites in Mexico